Boston Public is an American drama television series created by David E. Kelley and broadcast on Fox. Set in Boston, the series centers on Winslow High School, a fictional public high school in the Boston Public Schools district. It features a large ensemble cast and focuses on the work and private lives of the various teachers, students, and administrators at the school. It aired from October 2000 to January 2004. Its slogan was "Every day is a fight. For respect. For dignity. For sanity."

History
Boston Public initially preceded Ally McBeal on Monday nights, became revered and received critical acclaim for its drama and ethnically diverse cast. However, Fox moved it to the Friday night death slot for its fourth season. Viewership declined as a result and it was canceled after the 13th episode aired on January 30, 2004. Production halted after the 15th episode was completed. The final two episodes aired on March 1 and 2, 2005, later in syndication on TV One. Neither episode wrapped up any character stories.

The title of each episode was a numbered chapter, similar to that in a high school textbook, and each character appeared in a given story arc, with the professional and personal lives often intersecting.

Boston Public was the winner of the 2002 Peabody Award ("Chapter Thirty-Seven") from the Henry W. Grady College of Journalism and Mass Communication at the University of Georgia.

Cast and characters

Episodes

Boston Public ran for four seasons, consisting of 81 episodes. Each season contained 22 episodes, except the fourth season which had 15 episodes due to cancellation.

Crossover with The Practice

In The Practice episode, "The Day After" (season 5, episode 14), Kevin Riley asks Ellenor Frutt to represent him in a school board meeting when he's fired from Winslow High School, which takes place in the Boston Public episode "Chapter Thirteen" (season 1, episode 13). After Boston Public was canceled, Chi McBride reprised the role of Steven Harper on an episode of The Practice spin-off series Boston Legal in the episode "Let Sales Ring" (season 1, episode 16).

Awards and nominations
Boston Public received a total of 31 nominations from various award ceremonies, and won 8 of them.

Awards won
Emmy Awards
 Outstanding Art Direction for a Single Camera Series (2001)

NAACP Image Awards
 Outstanding Supporting Actress in a Drama Series – Loretta Devine (2001, 2003–2004)

Peabody Awards
 Peabody Award for Episode "Chapter Thirty-Seven"

Young Artist Awards
 Best Performance in a TV Series – Guest Starring Young Actor – Thomas Dekker (2004)

Nominations
Emmy Awards
 Outstanding Guest Actress in a Drama Series – Kathy Baker (2001)

NAACP Image Awards
 Outstanding Supporting Actress in a Drama Series – Rashida Jones (2002)
 Outstanding Actress in a Drama Series – Loretta Devine (2002)
 Outstanding Supporting Actress in a Drama Series – Vanessa Bell Calloway (2002)
 Outstanding Drama Series (2002–2004)

Television Critics Association Awards
 Individual Achievement in Drama – Chi McBride (2001)

Young Artist Awards
 Best Performance in a TV Drama Series – Guest Starring Young Actress – Ashley Tisdale (2001)
 Best Family TV Drama Series (2002)
 Best Performance in a TV Series – Guest Starring Young Actor – Miko Hughes (2004)

Teen Choice Awards
 Choice TV Breakout Star Female – Tamyra Gray (2003)

References

External links

 
 

2000 American television series debuts
2004 American television series endings
2000s American drama television series
2000s American high school television series
English-language television shows
Fox Broadcasting Company original programming
Peabody Award-winning television programs
Television shows set in Boston
Television series about bullying
Television series about educators
Television series by 20th Century Fox Television
The Practice
Television series created by David E. Kelley